Jon Anders Olsson Delér (born 17 August 1982) is a professional freeskier and alpine ski racer from Sweden. Born in Mora, Olsson Delér started his career as a ski racer but at age 16 he switched his race skis for twin tips and quit ski racing. Eight years later, after a 50 000 SEK (US$5826.22) bet with fellow skier Jens Byggmark, Olsson Delér started ski racing again with the goal of the bets being to make it to the Olympics in 2014. He now competes in both freestyle and ski racing. Olsson Delér is known for his invention of several new double flips, including a D-spin 720 into a flatspin 540 (DJ flip), a switch double rodeo 1080 (hexo flip), a double flatspin 900 (kangaroo flip), and a switch cork 720 to flatspin 540 (the tornado).

Since 2005 Olsson Delér has hosted the big air event Jon Olsson Invitational, also known as JOI. In 2007 the event was voted best big air event by freeskier magazine. From 2007 to 2010 he also hosted Jon Olsson Super Sessions (JOSS), a freeskiing film contest that takes place in Åre, Sweden. The event consisted of teams of skiers skiing for approximately two weeks with a film crew and creating a short ski film. Olsson Delér made his debut in the Alpine Skiing World Cup in Val-d'Isère in December 2010, as part of a plan to make the Swedish alpine ski team at the 2014 Winter Olympics. Hans Olsson, a Swedish alpine skier specialising in the speed events, is Jon Olsson Delér's brother.

Jon Anders Olsson Delér is also a professional freestyle rapper, Olsson Delér participated in a rap contest 2019. The event was hosted by Redbull and Olsson Delér ended up in the fourth-place in the tournament. The event was known as the biggest rap event in the history, which it was estimated that Olsson Delér earned approximately 2-million YouTube subscribers shortly after the event ended.

Personal life
Olsson began dating Janni Delér in 2012. They became engaged in November 2017, and were married in June 2018 in Marbella. The couple had a child named Leon in November 2019. In November 2020, the couple announced they were expecting their second child. Their daughter, Leia, was born in March 2021. They announced their separation in August 2022.

Social media influencer
Olsson shares his life through social media, documenting his day-to-day adventures through YouTube vlogs. In 2018, he donated €1,000 to charity for every vlog that was off schedule. In his vlogs, Olsson travels the world with his wife and his cameraman-editor Benjamin Ortega. On 4 January 2018, Jon Olsson Delér's YouTube page and Instagram page reached 1 million subscribers. He started his own bag company, called Douchebags, and in 2018, he became the creative director of the company. He also co-founded and runs a clothing company known as C'est Normal.

Competitions
Olsson Delér holds eleven Winter X-Games podiums. He has also won many other events including big air at Winter X-Games 08, The US Free Skiing Open in Vail, The Red Bull Big Air in Åre, Scandinavian Big Mountain Championships in Riksgränsen and the World Superpipe Championships in Whistler BC.
Since Olsson Delér's return to alpine ski racing in 2008 while training with coach, Guenther Birgmann at the Treble Cone Race Academy, he has won five FIS gs ski racers, with a ten-point fis result at Coronet Peak at the New Zealand National Championships.

Results

2011 1st Clash of the Nations, Big Air
2010 5th King of Style, big air, Stockholm, Sweden
2010 8th Budapest Fridge Festival, Budapest, Hun
2010 2nd Relentless Freeze Festival, London
2010 10th Freestyle.ch, big air, Zurich, SUI
2009 5th JOSS Team Sweden
2009 2nd X-Games, big air, Aspen, US
2008 3rd X-Games, slopestyle, Aspen, US
2008 1st X-Games, big air, Aspen, US
2007 1st Icer Air, big air, San Francisco, US
2007 1st Ski and Snowboard Festival, big air, Whistler, Canada
2007 1st US Freeskiing Open, slopestyle, Copper Mountain, US
2006 1st Jon Olsson Delér Invitational, big air, Åre, Sweden
2006 1st Ski and Snowboard Festival, big air, Whistler, Canada
2005 1st World Superpipe Champion, Park City, US
2005 4th Jon Olsson Delér Invitational, big air, Åre, Sweden
2005 3rd X-Games, superpipe, Aspen, US
2005 3rd X-Games, slopestyle, Aspen, US
2005 3rd US Freeskiing Open, slopestyle, Vail, US
2005 5th US Freeskiing Open, big air, Vail, US
2004 2nd Rip Curl, slopestyle, Saas Fee, Switzerland
2004 3rd Rip Curl, Halfpipe, Saas Fee, Switzerland
2004 1st Scandinavian Championships, Big Mountain, Riksgränsen, Sweden
2004 1st Nokia Totally Board, big air, Greece
2004 1st Ski and Snowboard Festival, big air, Whistler, Canada
2004 3rd US Freeskiing Open, big air, Vail, US
2004 2nd X-Games, superpipe, Aspen, US
2004 3rd X-Games, slopestyle, Aspen, US
2003 2nd Cape TownTotally Board, Nokia, big air
2003 1st Rip Curl, Total, Saas Fee, Switzerland
2003 1st Rip Curl, big air, Saas Fee, Switzerland
2003 3rd Rip Curl, Halfpipe, Saas Fee, Switzerland
2003 2nd Rip Curl, slopestyle, Saas Fee, Switzerland
2003 1st Air we go, big air, Oslo, Norway
2003 2nd King of the Globe, Stockholm, Sweden
2003 2nd Freestyle.ch, Zürich, Switzerland
2003 1st Ski and Snowboard Festival, big air, Whistler, Canada
2003 1st Ski and Rock, slopestyle, Sälen, Sweden
2003 1st Red Bull Big Air, Åre, Sweden
2003 2nd US Freeskiing Open, slopestyle, Vail, US
2003 4th US Freeskiing Open, superpipe, Vail, US
2003 3rd X-Games, superpipe, Aspen, US
2003 3rd X-Games, slopestyle, Aspen, US
2002 1st X-Games, superpipe, Aspen, US
2002 3rd X-Games, slopestyle, Aspen, US
1999 1st The Jump, big air, Åre, Sweden

References

External links
 Red Bull athlete page

1982 births
Swedish male freestyle skiers
Freeskiers
Swedish male alpine skiers
X Games athletes
Swedish expatriates in Monaco
People from Mora Municipality
Living people
Video bloggers
Sportspeople from Dalarna County